Grove Township may refer to:

Grove Township, Jasper County, Illinois
Grove Township, Adair County, Iowa
Grove Township, Cass County, Iowa
Grove Township, Davis County, Iowa
Grove Township, Humboldt County, Iowa
Grove Township, Pottawattamie County, Iowa
Grove Township, Taylor County, Iowa
Grove Township, Shawnee County, Kansas
Grove Township, Stearns County, Minnesota
Grove Township, Harnett County, North Carolina
Grove Township, Cameron County, Pennsylvania

Township name disambiguation pages